The protected areas of Puerto Rico include an array of natural areas in the archipelago of Puerto Rico, an unincorporated territory of the United States, managed by a number of agencies and entities belonging to both federal and commonwealth government bodies. Although Puerto Rico has no natural units in the National Park System, the biodiversity of the island is recognized and protected through a national forest, a national wildlife refuge, a national wilderness, and numerous state parks (called national parks in Puerto Rico), nature reserves, state forests, wildlife preserves and other designations on state, municipal and public-private administration levels.

Federal level

National Estuarine Research Reserves 

 Jobos Bay

National Forests 

 El Yunque

National Natural Landmarks 

 Baño de Oro Natural Area
 Cabo Rojo
 Mona and Monito Islands
 Puerto Mosquito
 Río Abajo State Forest

National Wild and Scenic Rivers 

 Icacos
 La Mina
 Mameyes

National Wilderness Preservation System 

 El Toro

National Wildlife Refuge 

 Caribbean Islands National Wildlife Refuge spanning Puerto Rico, the U.S. Virgin Islands and Navassa Island with the following units in Puerto Rico:
Cabo Rojo
Culebra
Desecheo
Laguna Cartagena
Vieques

Commonwealth level

Conservation Easement Sites (Servidumbres de conservación) 

 Centro Espíritu Santo
 El Rabanal
 El Tambor
 Foreman Conservation Easement
 Gulín Farm
 Ledesma Moulier Farm
 María Luisa Farm
 Montes Oscuros
 Palmas del Mar Tropical Forest
 Picaflor Conservation Easement
 Siembra Tres Vidas

Conservation Zones 
 Puerto Rico karst
Northern karst
Southern karst

Marine Reserves 
 Desecheo Island Coastal Waters Marine Reserve
 Isla Verde Reef Marine Reserve
 Tres Palmas Marine Reserve

Nature Reserves (Reservas Naturales) 

 Aguas Buenas Cave System
 Belvedere Farm (part of Boquerón State Forest)
 Caja de Muertos
 Caño La Boquilla
 Caño Martín Peña Nature Reserve
 Caño Tiburones
 Cayo Ratones (part of Boquerón State Forest)
 Cialitos River Nature Reserve
 Cibuco Swamp
 Condado Lagoon
 Cueva del Indio
 Espíritu Santo River Nature Reserve
 Guayama Reef
 Hacienda La Esperanza Nature Reserve
 Humacao Nature Reserve
 Joyuda Lagoon (part of Boquerón State Forest)
 La Cordillera Reef
 La Parguera (part of Boquerón State Forest)
 Las Cabachuelas Caves
 Las Cabezas de San Juan
 Las Cucharillas Swamp
 Las Piedras del Collado
 Luis Peña Channel
 Mata de Plátano Field Station
 Mona and Monito Islands Nature Reserve
 Northeast Ecological Corridor
Seven Seas Farm
 Planadas-Yeyesa Nature Reserve
 Playa Grande El Paraíso
 Pterocarpus Forest of Humacao
 Punta Ballenas Nature Reserve (part of Guánica State Forest)
 Punta Cucharas
 Punta Petrona Nature Reserve
 Punta Tuna Mangrove
 Punta Vientos Wetland
 Punta Yeguas
 San Juan Ecological Corridor
Cupey Arboretum
Doña Inés Mendoza Urban Forest
Los Capuchinos Forest
New Millennium State Forest
Old Piedras River Aqueduct
University of Puerto Rico Botanical Garden
 Tortuguero Lagoon
 Tourmaline Reef
 Vieques Bioluminescent Bay (Puerto Mosquito)

Protected Natural Areas (Áreas naturales protegidas) 

 Bairoa River Protected Natural Area
 Cerro Felíz
 Cerro La Tuna
 Cerro Las Mesas
 Cordillera Sabana Alta
 Culebras Protected Natural Area
 Dorado Pterocarpus Forest
 El Conuco Protected Natural Area
 El Convento Cave
 Encantado River Protected Natural Area
 Freddie Ramírez Protected Natural Area
 Guaynabo River Protected Natural Area
 Hacienda Buena Vista Protected Natural Area
 Hacienda Lago Protected Natural Area
 Hacienda Margarita Protected Natural Area
 Hacienda Pellejas Protected Natural Area
 Hermanas Sendra Protected Natural Area
 Jacaboa River Protected Natural Area
 Jájome
 Jorge Sotomayor del Toro Protected Natural Area
 La Pitahaya Protected Natural Area
 La Robleda Protected Natural Area
 Las Bocas Canyon
 Los Frailes Farm Protected Natural Area
 Los Llanos Protected Natural Area
 Luz Martínez de Benítez Protected Natural Area
 Maricao River Protected Natural Area
 Marín Alto Protected Natural Area
 Medio Mundo and Daguao Protected Natural Area
 Ojo de Agua Protected Natural Area
 Paraíso de las Lunas Protected Natural Area
 Punta Cabullones Protected Natural Area
 Punta Pozuelo Protected Natural Area
 Punta Soldado Protected Natural Area
 Quebrada Janer Protected Natural Area
 San Cristóbal Canyon
 San Juan Park Protected Natural Area
 Sana Muerto River Protected Natural Area
 Shapiro Protected Natural Area
 Sierra Pandura
 Toa Vaca River Protected Natural Area
 Toro Negro River Protected Natural Area
 Ulpiano Casal Protected Natural Area

Research Reserves (Áreas de investigación) 
 Guayama Research Area
 Manatí Research Area

State Forests (Bosques Estatales) 

 Aguirre
 Boquerón
 Cambalache
 Carite
 Ceiba
 Cerrillos
 Guajataca
 Guánica
 Guilarte
 Los Tres Picachos
 Maricao
 Monte Choca
 Nuevo Milenio
 Piñones
 del Pueblo
La Olimpia
 Río Abajo
 San Patricio
 Susúa
 Toro Negro
 Vega

State Parks (Parques Nacionales de Puerto Rico) and other protected areas 

 Caguana Ceremonial Indigenous Heritage Park
 Caguas Real Reserve (currently managed by the USFWS)
 Camuy River Caves
 El Tallonal
 El Verde Farm
 Finca Longo (managed by the DRNA forest service)
 José Santiago Farm
 Julio Enrique Monagas Park
 Las Casas de la Selva
 Nolla Farm

Wildlife Refuges (Refugios de Vida Silvestre) 
 Boquerón Iris Alameda Wildlife Refuge (part of Boquerón State Forest)
 Cerrillos Lake Wildlife Refuge
 El Buey Natural Wildlife Refuge
 Lake Guajataca Wildlife Refuge
 Lake La Plata Wildlife Refuge
 Lake Luchetti Wildlife Refuge

Municipal level 
 Caguas Regional Forest (Caguas)
 Chalets de Bairoa Natural Area (Caguas)
 Cerro Borrás (Caguas)
 Río Hondo Community Forest (Mayagüez)

References

External links 
 DRNA - Puerto Rico Department of Natural and Environmental Resources (Spanish)
 Para la Naturaleza - Puerto Rico Conservation Trust (Spanish)
 NPS - United States National Park System (English)
 USFS - United States Forest Service (English)

Puerto Rico
Protected
Protected